Vicke Viking is a series of children's books by Swedish author Runer Jonsson, first published in 1963. The series, set in the Viking era, was inspired by the Icelandic sagas and the Swedish novel The Long Ships. They were originally illustrated by Ewert Karlsson. The books have been widely translated, with the German version being particularly successful.

An animated television series, Vicky the Viking, and two films have been based on the series.

Plot overview
The books' main character is Vicke (Vicky in English, Wickie in Dutch and German), son of Halvar, chief of the Viking village of Flake. Unlike his village fellows – including most of the other boys of his age – Vicke is blessed with a sharp and imaginative mind which helps him and his fellow Vikings out of many tight situations.

Characters
Vicke, the series' titular character, a boy of about 10 years of age. He is very timid and has a special fear of wolves, but his brains eventually help him solve any problem he's confronted with.
Halvar, Vicke's father and chief of Flake. A rather boastful character who prefers to solve problems with brawn, but who eventually learns to listen to and value Vicke's ideas.
Tjure and Snorre, two Vikings in Halvar's crew who constantly quarrel about anything despite (or maybe because) they really care deeply about each other.
Urobe, the oldest Viking in Halvar's crew. While he is rather old and not as imaginative as Vicke, he is quite knowledgeable in sagas and legend lore, and he is respected as a fair judge and mediator.
Faxe is the biggest and strongest, but also the slowest, of Flake's Vikings. He enjoys a close big-brother relationship with Vicke.
Gorm, a rather over-excited fellow among the Flake Vikings who occupies the position of the lookout on Halvar's ship.
Ulme, a rather neat person who considers himself a poetic soul and even carries a harp to play on joyous occasions.
Ylva, Vicke's mother, who is far more supportive of her son's intelligence than his father is.
Ylvie, a young girl in Flake who is Vicke's neighbour and most ardent supporter. In the German movie adaptation this adoration is portrayed as a childhood crush.
Gilby, the strongest boy in Flake and Vicke's prime rival, though intellectually he is clearly Vicke's inferior.
Sven the Terrible, a vicious Viking pirate who does not hesitate robbing even his fellow Vikings of their hard-earned plunder.
Pokka, Sven's devious second-in-command.

Books 
Vicke Viking (1963)
Vicke Viking lurar de rödögda (1965)
Vicke Viking Hederskung (1966)
Vicke Viking i Vinland (1967)
Vicke Viking hos burduserna (1969)
Vicke Viking störtar tyrannerna (1975)
Vicke tar över (1994)

Other media
There is a Japanese animated cartoon based on the story called Vicky the Viking, which enjoyed a tremendous success in the European children TV networks. A video game, Vicky the Viking: The Big Trial, was based on the cartoon. A ride at the Plopsa Coo Studio 100 theme park in Liège reflects the show's popularity in Belgium.
A German live-action movie adaptation of the stories by Michael Herbig, titled Vicky the Viking was released in summer 2009. A sequel to that adaptation was released in 2011 as Vicky and the Treasure of the Gods.

References

Swedish children's literature
Series of children's books
Children's historical novels
Novels set in the Viking Age
Fictional Vikings
Literary characters introduced in 1963
1963 children's books
Male characters in literature
Child characters in literature
Swedish novels adapted into television shows
Works based on sagas
1963 Swedish novels

ja:小さなバイキング